Bathybates leo is a species of fish in the family Cichlidae. It is endemic to Lake Tanganyika where it forms schools and feeds mainly on clupeids.

References

leo
Taxa named by Max Poll
Fish described in 1956
Taxonomy articles created by Polbot